The Guépard-class destroyers (contre-torpilleurs) were six ships of the French Navy, laid down in 1927 and commissioned in 1930. They were similar to the previous Chacal class, with a larger hull and with a slightly improved speed and gun armament with 138 mm guns of a new design. The first three ships bore 'animal' names like the Chacals, while the remaining three were given names starting with V, for two battles and a field-marshal. The class saw action in World War II.

Ships
 
Built by Arsenal de Lorient.
Completed 10 October 1930.
She was sunk by German Junkers Ju 87 Stukas while taking part in the evacuation of Namsos, on 3 May 1940, off Trondheim. Out of 229 members on the crew, 136 were lost.
 ("Cheetah")
Built by Arsenal de Lorient.
Completed 13 August 1929,
Scuttled 27 November 1942.
Refloated 4 September 1943.
Bombed and sunk March 1944.
Refloated 1947 and broken up.

Built by Ateliers et Chantiers de France, Dunkirk.
Completed 21 January 1931.
Seized by Germans 27 November 1942.
Given to Italy and entered service as FR 21.
Scuttled La Spezia 9 September 1943.
 (named after the battle of Valmy)
Built by Ateliers et Chantiers de St Nazaire-Penhoët, St. Nazaire
Completed 1 January 1930.
Seized by Germans 27 November 1942.
Refloated 15 March 1943 and began refit as Italian Navy FR 24
Captured by Germans at Savona September 1943
Wreck found at Genoa 1945 and broken up.
 (named after the battle of Verdun)
Built by Ateliers et Chantiers de la Loire, St Nazaire.
Completed 1 April 1930.
Scuttled 27 November 1942.
Refloated 29 September 1943.
Bombed and sunk 1944
Refloated 1948 and broken up in Italy.
 (named after Marshal Sébastien Le Prestre de Vauban)
Built by Ateliers et Chantiers de France, Dunkirk.
Completed 9 January 1931.
Scuttled 27 November 1942.
Refloated 12 May 1947 and broken up.

Notes

References

 
 

Destroyer classes
World War II destroyers of France
 
Ship classes of the French Navy